In topology, a branch of mathematics, a lamination is a :
 "topological space partitioned into subsets"
 decoration (a structure or property at a point) of a manifold in which some subset of the manifold is partitioned into sheets of some lower dimension, and the sheets are locally parallel. 

A lamination of a surface is a partition of a closed subset of the surface into smooth curves.

It may or may not be possible to fill the gaps in a lamination to make a foliation.

Examples

A geodesic lamination of a 2-dimensional hyperbolic manifold is a closed subset together with a foliation of this closed subset by geodesics. These are used in Thurston's classification of elements of the mapping class group and in his theory of earthquake maps.  
Quadratic laminations, which remain invariant under the angle doubling map. These laminations are associated with quadratic maps. It is a closed collection of chords in the unit disc. It is also topological model of Mandelbrot or Julia set.

See also 
 train track (mathematics)
 Orbit portrait

Notes

References 
Conformal Laminations Thesis by Vineet Gupta, California Institute of Technology Pasadena, California 2004

Topology
Manifolds